Daffy Duck is an animated cartoon character created for Leon Schlesinger Productions by animators Tex Avery and Bob Clampett. Styled as an anthropomorphic black duck, he has appeared in cartoon series such as Looney Tunes and Merrie Melodies, in which he is usually depicted as a foil for either Bugs Bunny or Porky Pig. He was one of the first of the new "screwball" characters that emerged in the late 1930s to replace traditional everyman characters who were more popular earlier in the decade, such as Mickey Mouse, Porky Pig, and Popeye.

Daffy starred in 130 shorts in the golden age, making him the third-most frequent character in the Looney Tunes/Merrie Melodies cartoons, behind Bugs Bunny's 167 appearances and Porky Pig's 153 appearances. Virtually every Warner Bros. cartoon director, most notably Bob Clampett, Robert McKimson, and Chuck Jones, put his own spin on the Daffy Duck character.

He was ranked number 14 on TV Guides list of top 50 greatest cartoon characters.

History

Origin
Daffy first appeared in Porky's Duck Hunt, released on April 17, 1937. The cartoon was directed by Tex Avery and animated by Bob Clampett. Porky's Duck Hunt is a standard hunter/prey pairing, but Daffy (barely more than an unnamed bit player in this short) was something new to moviegoers: an assertive, completely unrestrained, combative protagonist. Clampett later recalled:
 "At that time, audiences weren't accustomed to seeing a cartoon character do these things. And so, when it hit the theaters it was an explosion. People would leave the theaters talking about this daffy duck."

This early Daffy is less anthropomorphic and resembles a normal black duck. In fact, the only aspects of the character that have remained consistent through the years are his voice characterization by Mel Blanc; and his black feathers with a white neck ring. Blanc's characterization of Daffy once held the world record for the longest characterization of one animated character by their original actor: 52 years.

The origin of Daffy's voice, with its lateral lisp, is a matter of some debate. One often-repeated "official" story is that it was modeled after producer Leon Schlesinger's tendency to lisp. However, in Mel Blanc's autobiography, That's Not All Folks!, he contradicts that conventional belief, writing, "It seemed to me that such an extended mandible would hinder his speech, particularly on words containing an s sound. Thus 'despicable' became 'desth-picable.'"

Daffy's slobbery, exaggerated lisp was developed over time, and it is barely noticeable in the early cartoons. In Daffy Duck & Egghead, Daffy does not lisp at all except in the separately drawn set-piece of Daffy singing "The Merry-Go-Round Broke Down" in which just a slight lisp can be heard.

In The Scarlet Pumpernickel (1950), Daffy has a middle name, Dumas as the writer of a swashbuckling script, a nod to Alexandre Dumas. Also, in the Baby Looney Tunes episode "The Tattletale", Granny addresses Daffy as "Daffy Horatio Tiberius Duck". In The Looney Tunes Show (2011), the joke middle names "Armando" and "Sheldon" are used.

Golden Age Years

Daffy's early years, 1937–1940
Tex Avery and Bob Clampett created the original version of Daffy in 1937. Daffy established his status by jumping into the water, hopping around, and yelling, "Woo-hoo!" Animator Bob Clampett immediately seized upon the Daffy Duck character and cast him in a series of cartoons in the 1930s and 1940s. The early Daffy is a wild and zany screwball, perpetually bouncing around the screen with cries of "Hoo-hoo! Hoo-hoo!" (In his autobiography, Mel Blanc stated that the zany demeanor was inspired by Hugh Herbert's catchphrase, which was taken to a wild extreme for Daffy.)

World War II Daffy, 1941–1945

Daffy would also feature in several war-themed shorts during World War II, remaining true to his unbridled nature. He battles a Nazi goat intent on eating Daffy's scrap metal in Scrap Happy Daffy (1943), hits Adolf Hitler's head with a giant mallet in Daffy the Commando (1943) and outwits Hitler, Goebbels and Goering in Plane Daffy (1944). Oddly enough, it was only after these wartime escapades that Daffy is actually subject to conscription into military service, in the form of "the little man from the draft board", whom he tries to dodge in Draftee Daffy (1945). In the real world, Daffy was indeed "drafted" as a mascot for the 600th Bombardment Squadron.

Evolving "Earlier" Daffy 1946–1952
For Daffy Doodles (his first Looney Tunes cartoon as a director), Robert McKimson tamed Daffy a bit, redesigning him yet again to be rounder and less elastic. The studio also instilled some of Bugs Bunny's savvy into the duck, making him as brilliant with his mouth as he was with his battiness. Daffy was teamed up with Porky Pig; the duck's one-time rival became his straight man. Arthur Davis, who directed Warner Bros. cartoon shorts for a few years in the late 1940s until upper management decreed there should be only three units (McKimson, Friz Freleng, and Jones), presented a Daffy similar to McKimson's. McKimson is noted as the last of the three units to make his Daffy uniform with Jones's, with even late shorts, such as Don't Axe Me (1958), featuring traits of the "screwball" Daffy. Starting in You Were Never Duckier, Daffy's personality evolved to be from being less loony and more greedy.

Experimenting with Daffy 1953–1964
While Daffy's looney days were over, McKimson continued to make him as bad or good as his various roles required him to be. McKimson would use this Daffy from 1946 to 1961. Although, even McKimson would follow in Jones' footsteps in many aspects with cartoons like People Are Bunny (1959) and Ducking the Devil (1957). Friz Freleng's version took a hint from Chuck Jones to make the duck more sympathetic, as in the 1957 Show Biz Bugs. Here, Daffy is overemotional and jealous of Bugs, yet he has real talent that is ignored by the theater manager and the crowd. This cartoon finishes with a sequence in which Daffy attempts to wow the Bugs-besotted audience with an act in which he drinks gasoline and swallows nitroglycerine, gunpowder, and uranium-238 (in a greenish solution), jumps up and down to "shake well" and finally swallows a lit match that detonates the whole improbable mixture. When Bugs tells Daffy that the audience loves the act and wants more, Daffy, now a ghost floating upward (presumably to Heaven), says that he can only do the act once. Some TV stations, and in the 1990s the cable network TNT, edited out the dangerous act, afraid of imitation by young children.

Pairing of Daffy and Porky in parodies of popular movies, 1951–1965
While Bugs Bunny became Warner Bros.' most popular character, the directors still found ample use for Daffy. Several cartoons place him in parodies of popular movies and radio serials; Porky Pig was usually a comic relief sidekick. For example, Daffy in The Great Piggy Bank Robbery (1946) as "Duck Twacy" (Dick Tracy) by Bob Clampett; in The Scarlet Pumpernickel (1950), Daffy was the hero and Porky Pig was the villain. In Drip-Along Daffy (1951), named after the Hopalong Cassidy character, throws Daffy into a Western with him labeled "Western-Type Hero" and Porky Pig labeled "Comedy Relief". In Duck Dodgers in the 24½th Century (1953), a parody of Buck Rogers, Daffy trades barbs (and bullets) with Marvin the Martian, with Porky Pig retaining the role of Daffy's sidekick. In Rocket Squad (1956), a parody of Dragnet and Racket Squad, Daffy and Porky Pig pair up once again. Daffy also played Stupor Duck, a parody of the Adventures of Superman television series. Robin Hood Daffy (1958) casts the duck in the role of the legendary outlaw Robin Hood with Porky Pig as Friar Tuck. Besides being playing parodies, Daffy also played a salesman-who continually annoys a potential customer into buying something: in Fool Coverage, Daffy actually succeeds into selling Porky Pig a $1,000,000 accident policy which only works under impossible conditions-unfortunately for Daffy, all the conditions occur!

Pairing of Bugs and Daffy, 1951–1964
Bugs's ascension to stardom also prompted the Warner Bros. animators to recast Daffy as the rabbit's rival, intensely jealous, insecure and determined to steal back the spotlight, while Bugs either remained cool headed but mildly amused and/or indifferent to the duck's jealousy and/or used it to his advantage. Daffy's desire to achieve stardom at almost any cost was explored as early as 1940 in Freleng's You Ought to Be in Pictures, but the idea was most successfully used by Chuck Jones, who redesigned the duck once again, making him scrawnier and scruffier. In Jones' "Hunting Trilogy" (or "Duck Season/Rabbit Season Trilogy") of Rabbit Fire, Rabbit Seasoning and Duck! Rabbit, Duck! (each respectively launched in 1951, 1952, and 1953), Daffy's attention-grabbing ways and excitability provide Bugs Bunny the perfect opportunity to fool the hapless Elmer Fudd into repeatedly shooting the duck's bill off. Also, these cartoons reveal Daffy's catchphrase, "Youuu're deththpicable!" Jones' Daffy sees himself as self-preservationist, not selfish. However, this Daffy can do nothing that does not backfire on him, more likely to singe his tail feathers as well as his ego and pride than anything. It is thought that Chuck Jones based Daffy Duck's new personality on his fellow animator Bob Clampett, who, like Daffy, was known as a loud self-promoter. In Beanstalk Bunny Daffy, Bugs and Elmer are once again teamed up in a parody of Jack and the Beanstalk (with Elmer as the giant); in A Star Is Bored Daffy tries to upstage Bugs Bunny; while in the spoofs of the TV shows The Millionaire and This Is Your Life, The Million Hare Daffy tries to defeat his arch-rival Bugs Bunny for a $1,000,000.00 prize given out by his favorite TV show and This Is a Life? Daffy tries to upstage Bugs Bunny in order to be the guest of honor on the show; in all four of these cartoons Daffy ends up a loser because of his own overemotional personality (which impairs Daffy's common sense and reasoning ability) and his craving for attention.

Solo Daffy
Film critic Steve Schneider calls Jones' version of Daffy "a kind of unleashed id." Jones said that his version of the character "expresses all of the things we're afraid to express." This is evident in Jones' Duck Amuck (1953), "one of the few unarguable masterpieces of American animation" according to Schneider. In the episode, Daffy is plagued by a godlike animator whose malicious paintbrush alters the setting, soundtrack, and even Daffy. When Daffy demands to know who is responsible for the changes, the camera pulls back to reveal none other than Bugs Bunny. Duck Amuck is widely heralded as a classic of filmmaking for its illustration that a character's personality can be recognized independently of appearance, setting, voice, and plot. In 1999, the short was selected for preservation in the United States National Film Registry.

Daffy's pairing with Speedy in 1965–1968
When the Warner Bros. animation studio briefly outsourced cartoon production to DePatie-Freleng Enterprises (DFE) in the 1960s, Daffy Duck became an antagonist in several cartoons opposite Speedy Gonzales, who refers to Daffy as "the loco duck." In Well Worn Daffy (1965), Daffy is determined to keep the mice away from a desperately needed well seemingly for no other motive than pure maliciousness. Furthermore, when he draws all the water he wants, Daffy then attempts to destroy the well in spite of the vicious pointlessness of the act, forcing Speedy to stop him. The Warner Bros. studio was entering its twilight years, and even Daffy had to stretch for humor in the period. In many of the later DFE cartoons, such as Feather Finger and Daffy's Diner, Daffy is portrayed as a more sympathetic character (often forced to turn against Speedy at the behest of a common enemy) rather than the full-blown villain he is in cartoons like Well Worn Daffy and Assault and Peppered. The last cartoon featuring Daffy and Speedy is See Ya Later Gladiator, in what animation fans call the worst cartoon made by Warner Bros.

The Daffy Duck Show
In light of the longstanding popularity of The Bugs Bunny Show and its various incarnations on CBS and ABC, NBC commissioned their own half-hour series, The Daffy Duck Show, which began airing in the fall of 1978. While some well-known titles were included in the program, most of the cartoons featured on the series were from the late '60s Depatie-Freleng run. The program ran on NBC for two years, then in 1981 was rechristened The Daffy/Speedy Show and ran for another two years. Eventually, NBC canceled the series, and many of the cartoons were reintegrated into the lineups for the respective CBS and ABC Bugs Bunny shows.

More recent years
Daffy appeared in later cartoons. He was one of many Looney Tunes characters allowed by Warner Bros. to appear in the 1988 Disney/Amblin film Who Framed Roger Rabbit. In the film, Daffy (utilizing his original, wacky characterization) shares a scene with his Disney counterpart Donald Duck whilst performing in a piano duel. In 1987, to celebrate Daffy's 50th anniversary, Warner Bros. released "The Duxorcist" as its first theatrical Looney Tunes short in two decades. Daffy Duck also appeared in several feature-film compilations, including two films centering on Daffy. The first was released in 1983, Daffy Duck's Fantastic Island; the second came in 1988, Daffy Duck's Quackbusters, which is considered one of the Looney Tunes''' best compilation films and featured another new theatrical short, "The Night of the Living Duck". Daffy has also had major roles in films such as Space Jam in 1996 and Looney Tunes: Back in Action in 2003. The latter film does much to flesh out his character, even going so far as to cast a sympathetic light on Daffy's glory-seeking ways in one scene, where he complains that he works tirelessly without achieving what Bugs does without even trying. That same year, Warner Bros. cast him in a brand-new Duck Dodgers series. (It should be stressed that in this show, Duck Dodgers actually is Daffy Duck due to him being frozen in suspended animation in some unknown incident.) He had a cameo appearance in The Sylvester & Tweety Mysteries episode "When Granny Ruled the Earth", first airing on March 27, 1999. Daffy has also been featured in several webtoons, which can be viewed online.

Daffy has also made appearances on numerous television series. In Tiny Toon Adventures, Daffy is a teacher at Acme Looniversity, where he is the hero and mentor of student Plucky Duck. He is shown as a baby in Baby Looney Tunes and appears to have a similar personality to some of his earlier years with him being a rival of Bugs and saying Woo-hoo! a lot. show and made occasional cameo appearances on Animaniacs and Histeria!. In Loonatics Unleashed, his descendant is Danger Duck (voiced by Jason Marsden), who is also lame and unpopular to his teammates. A majority of these appearances try to emulate Chuck Jones of the characters.

Daffy has also been given larger roles in more recent Looney Tunes films and series. Following Looney Tunes: Back in Action, Warner Bros. has slowly moved the spotlight away from Bugs and more towards Daffy, as shown in the 2006 direct-to-video movie Bah, Humduck! A Looney Tunes Christmas, where Daffy plays the lead, while Bugs appears in a minor supporting role.

However, more recent merchandise of the duck, as well as that featured on the official website, have been shown to incorporate elements of the zanier, more light-hearted Daffy of the 1930s and 1940s. Producer Larry Doyle noted that recent theatrical cartoons were planned that would portray a more diverse Daffy closer to that of Robert McKimson's design; however, due to the box office bomb of Looney Tunes: Back in Action, these new films ceased production.

Daffy returned to Cartoon Network in The Looney Tunes Show, voiced by Jeff Bergman. In the show, he has moved out of the forest and shares Bugs' house with him. Unlike Bugs and their neighbors, Daffy has no way of earning money and relies on Bugs for food and shelter. He tried on numerous occasions to get rich quick, but ended up failing repeatedly. Daffy's one possession he is proud of is his paper-mache parade float, constructed on top of a flatbed truck, which is his main means of transportation. While Daffy's greed and jealousy of Bugs remains, he appears to be less antagonistic in this show, as Bugs even tells Daffy in spite of his faults, he is Bugs' best friend and vice versa. Daffy serves as a sort of mentor to Gossamer. Daffy has difficulty telling fiction from reality; he often confuses television shows for his own life, believes Bugs is Superman, and at one point hallucinates he is a wizard.

Daffy starred in the 3-D short Daffy's Rhapsody with Elmer Fudd that was originally set to premiere before Happy Feet Two but instead debuted prior to Journey 2: The Mysterious Island. The short features Daffy and Elmer in the first CG or 3-D depiction of these specific Looney Tunes characters. According to Matthew O'Callaghan, who directed the short, the audio comes from a 1950s recording for a children's album. Daffy is performing in a hunting musical, when Elmer, who is in the audience, pursues him. Daffy is initially unaware of the danger, but quickly realizes the threat Elmer poses and outwits him by using the props against him.

Daffy appeared in the 2015 DTV movie Looney Tunes: Rabbits Run.

Daffy appears in the Cartoon Network series New Looney Tunes where he is voiced by Dee Bradley Baker. Daffy is often paired with Porky where Daffy will annoy and bedevil the pig, though occasionally Porky one ups Daffy.

Daffy appears in Looney Tunes Cartoons, where he is voiced by Eric Bauza.

Daffy appears in the preschool series Bugs Bunny Builders which currently airs on Cartoon Network's Cartoonito block and HBO Max. Eric Bauza reprises his role.

Comics
Dell Comics published several Daffy Duck comic books, beginning in Four Color Comics #457, #536, and #615 and then continuing as Daffy #4-17 (1956–59), then as Daffy Duck #18-30 (1959–62). The comic book series was subsequently continued in Gold Key Comics Daffy Duck #31-127 (1962–79). This run was in turn continued under the Whitman Comics imprint until the company completely ceased comic book publication in 1984. In 1994, corporate cousin DC Comics became the publisher for comics featuring all the classic Warner Bros. cartoon characters, and while not getting his own title, Daffy has appeared in many issues of Looney Tunes.

Voice actors

 Mel Blanc (1937–1989, Daffy's Rhapsody; archive audio)
 Bob Clampett (vocal effects in A Corny Concerto)
 Richard Bickenbach (imitating Bing Crosby in Hollywood Daffy)
 Gilbert Mack (Golden Records records, Bugs Bunny Songfest)
 Dave Barry (Golden Records records, Bugs Bunny Songfest)
 Richard Andrews (Bugs Bunny Exercise and Adventure Album)
 Dave Spafford ("woo-hoos" in Who Framed Roger Rabbit)
 Bob Bergen (ABC Family Fun Fair, Kids' WB commercial)
 Mel Tormé (singing voice in Daffy Duck's Quackbusters)
 Jeff Bergman (1989 Macy's Thanksgiving Day Parade, Cartoon All-Stars to the Rescue, Gremlins 2: The New Batch, Happy Birthday, Bugs!: 50 Looney Years, Tiny Toon Adventures, Tyson Foods commercials, Box Office Bunny, Bugs Bunny's Overtures to Disaster, (Blooper) Bunny, Invasion of the Bunny Snatchers, The Plucky Duck Show, Special Delivery Symphony, Cartoon Network bumpers, Boomerang bumpers, Ad Council commercial, The Looney Tunes Show, Mad, Scooby Doo and Looney Tunes: Cartoon Universe, Looney Tunes Dash, Looney Tunes: Rabbits Run, Wun Wabbit Wun, Daffy Duck Dance Off, Ani-Mayhem, Meet Bugs (and Daffy))
 Noel Blanc (You Rang? answering machine messages, Chevrolet Monte Carlo 400 with the Looney Tunes)
 Joe Alaskey (Tiny Toon Adventures, Bugs Bunny's Lunar Tunes, Looney Tunes River Ride, Yosemite Sam and the Gold River Adventure!, Have Yourself a Looney Tunes Christmas, 67th Academy Awards, Carrotblanca, Bugs & Daffy Sing the Beatles, Bugs 'n' Daffy intro, Marvin the Martian in the Third Dimension, Bugs & Friends Sing Elvis, Bugs Bunny's Learning Adventures, The Drew Carey Show, Warner Bros. Sing-Along: Quest for Camelot, Warner Bros. Sing-Along: Looney Tunes, The Sylvester & Tweety Mysteries, Tweety's High-Flying Adventure, The Looney Tunes Kwazy Christmas, Duck Dodgers, Looney Tunes: Back in Action, Daffy Duck for President, Bah, Humduck! A Looney Tunes Christmas, Looney Tunes: Laff Riot pilot, TomTom Looney Tunes GPS, Looney Tunes ClickN READ Phonics, Lego Batman 3: Beyond Gotham, various video games, webtoons, live shows, and commercials)
 Greg Burson (Bugs Bunny's Birthday Ball, Tiny Toon Adventures, Daffy Duck: The Marvin Missions, Animaniacs, Bugs Bunny: Rabbit Rampage, Acme Animation Factory, Looney Tunes B-Ball, Warner Bros. Kids Club, Quest for Camelot promotion, Looney Tunes: Back in Action animation test)
 Keith Scott (Looney Tunes Musical Revue, Spectacular Light and Sound Show Illuminanza, Looney Tunes: We Got the Beat!, Looney Tunes on Ice, Looney Tunes LIVE! Classroom Capers, The Looney Tunes Radio Show, Looney Rock, Looney Tunes Christmas Carols, various commercials)"Keith Scott-"The One-Man Crowd"". Retrieved August 23, 2020.
 Maurice LaMarche (Taz-Mania)
 Frank Gorshin (Superior Duck)
 Dee Bradley Baker (Space Jam, Boomerang bumpers, New Looney Tunes, Converse commercials)
 Billy West (Histeria!)
 Samuel Vincent (Baby Looney Tunes, Baby Looney Tunes' Eggs-traordinary Adventure)
 Jeff Bennett (Sprint commercial, Wendy's commercial, Attack of the Drones, A Looney Tunes Sing-A-Long Christmas)
 Tom Jones (speaking and singing in Jones' voice in an episode of Duck Dodgers)
 Bill Farmer (Robot Chicken)
 Kevin Shinick (Mad)
 Gary Martin (Looney Tunes Take-Over Weekend promotion)
 Eric Bauza (Looney Tunes: World of Mayhem, Looney Tunes Cartoons, Animaniacs, Bugs Bunny in The Golden Carrot, Space Jam: A New Legacy, Bugs and Daffy's Thanksgiving Road Trip, Bugs Bunny Builders)

Other media
 In 1991, Daffy Duck had a number 58 hit in the UK charts with a house/dance record called "Party Zone", a record which featured songwriters/producers Giorgio and Martin Koppehele under one of their aliases called The Groove Gang (other aliases have included G. + M. Cope and Cymurai). The record was issued by Warner's eastwest label and spent three weeks in the UK charts.
 In 1999, the United States Postal Service issued a 33 cent stamp, designed and illustrated by Ed Wleczyk of Warner Bros., featuring Daffy leaning against a rural mailbox with a "that's despicable" look directed at two letters in the mailbox that bear Bugs Bunny stamps.
 Daffy makes a vocal cameo appearance in the 2020 Animaniacs'' revival segment "Suffragette City", with Eric Bauza reprising his role.

See also

 List of Daffy Duck cartoons
 Golden age of American animation
 Duck Dodgers
 Danger Duck

References

Sources
 
 
 

Anthropomorphic ducks
Dell Comics titles
Film characters introduced in 1937
Fictional characters who break the fourth wall
Fictional characters with speech impediment
Fictional tricksters
Fictional World War II veterans
Gold Key Comics titles
Looney Tunes characters
Tex Avery
Male characters in animation
Male characters in television
Animated characters